Kill Cheerleadër (previously known as Cheerleader 666) was a Canadian rock band whose members formed in 1999 in Toronto. Mainly influenced by punk rock and heavy metal acts such as The Stooges, early era Guns N' Roses, Mötley Crüe, Iron Maiden, the Ramones, Girlschool, Joan Jett and Neil Young, they had crafted their own unique, sleazy style of rock 'n' roll, once being described as "a derailed train hitting a Baptist Church". Lemmy from Motörhead described Kill Cheerleader as the "greatest rock n' roll band since Guns N' Roses."

History 
The original members of the group were childhood friends who learned their instruments practicing old Guns N' Roses, The Stooges and Mötley Crüe songs. A band member reportedly said that the name came from miserable high school experiences, saying, "beat up the jocks and kill the cheerleaders". They started off playing shows in Toronto but were soon banned from clubs for their on and off stage antics. They started playing shows in Southern California after being invited by Chris Squire to open dates for his garage punk group, The Tori Cobras. During this tour Squire introduced the band to professional skateboarder, Kris Markovich, landing Kill Cheerleader the opening music track in Markovich's "Hollywood Skateboards" video. After this tour the band became popular among hardcore skateboarders and so-cal punk rockers.

After some 8000 demo CDs were sold, a German record label licensed one of their unmixed/unmastered recordings and released it as 7 track LP titled Gutter Days which was rereleased on 10" vinyl in 2003. One reviewer called it "the greatest punk n' roll recording ever made... completely redefined excellence in that genre... I am shaken..." (House of Smut). Ky Anto, lead guitarist for Robin Black once called them "The sound of desperation"... Nikki Sixx of Mötley Crüe called them the "best new band" in his online journal. SPIN Magazine journalists wrote how they were "blown away" about their live show, and Alternative Press has called them a "band to watch."  Rock legend Lemmy from Motörhead invited them to open their UK tour  and talked about them on SuicideGirls.com and in Playboy, declaring Kïll Cheerleadër as the "greatest rock n' roll band since Guns N' Roses."

Their music has been described as "the greatest fusion of Stooges/Guns fuck rock anyone has ever spewed", as well as "taking the energy of early Motorhead while grinding it together with the energy of bands like The Ramones or The Stooges". Critics have also stated that "pre-punk rockers The Stooges, glam stalwarts Motley Crue, and straight-up scumbags Guns N' Roses have their fingerprints all over Kill Cheerleader's sound". Ethan Deth has pointed out that "we have our punk and metal songs but we also have a strong Neil Young influence, which we don't ignore".

After travelling to the U.S west coast and playing a number of high-profile shows in Los Angeles the band gained a new following for their destructive and fresh take on dirty punk-metal. Their debut album All Hail was released in 2004 through Spinerazor Records.

The band broke up in 2006 on the eve of a major record deal.

Aftermath 
Kill Cheerleader split off into many new bands. Ethan Deth (as Ethan Kath) formed successful electronic music band Crystal Castles and soon drafted in Kill Cheerleader drummer Christoper Chartrand (aka Kriss Rites). Jason Decay started heavy metal band Goat Horn, which achieved success after morphing into Cauldron. Anthony Bleed (aka Useless aka Cobra) joined Canadian hard rock radio mainstays Die Mannequin and now releases acoustic music as tonyswar. Jimmy Nova formed a rock & roll band called Darlings of Chelsea with a member of Black Halos. Jacki Slaughter leads 80s metal revivalists Skull Fist who have achieved success in Europe and Japan.

Discography 
2000: Demo CD-R
2001: Gutter Days (CD-R released in 2001, 10" vinyl released in 2003 as Cheerleader 666)
2004: All Hail (debut full-length CD as Kill Cheerleader released on Spinerazor/Corporate Punishment in 2004, re-issued on Sanctuary in 2006, limited vinyl release on Yeah Right Records in 2015.)

See also 

Music of Canada
Canadian rock
List of bands from Canada

References 

Musical groups established in 1999
Musical groups disestablished in 2006
Musical groups from Toronto
Canadian heavy metal musical groups
Canadian punk rock groups
1999 establishments in Ontario
2006 disestablishments in Ontario
Sanctuary Records artists